Angry man may refer to:

 Angry white man
 Angry black man
 Angry Asian Man

See also
 Angry black woman
 One Angry Man (disambiguation)
 Angry young man (disambiguation)